Sodium dithiophosphate is the salt with the formula Na3PS2O2.  It is usually supplied as the hydrated solid or as an aqueous solution together with other thiophosphates such as sodium monothiophosphate and sodium trithiophosphate.  It is a colorless compound, but commercial samples can appear dark owing to the presence of impurities.  It is used to facilitate the isolation of molybdenum from its ores.

Preparation
The compound has been prepared in a multistep process starting with the base hydrolysis of phosphorus pentasulfide:
P2S5  +  6 NaOH   →   2 Na3PO2S2  +  H2S  +  2 H2O
The salt is isolated as the hydrate Na3PO2S2.(H2O)11.  It is prone to hydrolysis, especially when it is heated as an aqueous solutions:
Na3PO2S2  +  2 H2O   →   Na3PO3S  +  H2S

Its structure has been examined by X-ray crystallography.

Applications
This salt is used as a flotation agent in the purification of molybdenite (MoS2) from other components of the ores, where it is usually known as "Nokes reagent" (after Charles M. Nokes, who patented it in 1948).  The salt is generated by the reaction of phosphorus pentasulfide with sodium hydroxide, often using impure reagents to obtain a mixture of the desired salt and related thiophosphates and oxidized species.  Molybdenite particles, which are normally hydrophobic, become hydrophilic in the presence of this salt.  In this context, the Nokes reagent is called a "depressant," because it suppresses the flotation tendency of the solids other than molybdenite.

See also
 Diethyl dithiophosphoric acid
 Zinc dithiophosphate

References

Phosphorothioates
Sulfides
Sodium compounds
Metallurgical processes